System of systems is a collection of task-oriented or dedicated systems that pool their resources and capabilities together to create a new, more complex system which offers more functionality and performance than simply the sum of the constituent systems. Currently, systems of systems is a critical research discipline for which frames of reference, thought processes, quantitative analysis, tools, and design methods are incomplete. The methodology for defining, abstracting, modeling, and analyzing system of systems problems is typically referred to as system of systems engineering.

Overview 
Commonly proposed descriptions—not necessarily definitions—of systems of systems, are outlined below in order of their appearance in the literature:

 Linking systems into joint system of systems allows for the interoperability and synergism of Command, Control, Computers, Communications and Information (C4I) and Intelligence, Surveillance and Reconnaissance (ISR) Systems: description in the field of information superiority in modern military.
 System of systems are large-scale concurrent and distributed systems the components of which are complex systems themselves: description in the field of communicating structures and information systems in private enterprise.
System of systems education involves the integration of systems into system of systems that ultimately contribute to evolution of the social infrastructure: description in the field of education of engineers on the importance of systems and their integration.
 System of systems integration is a method to pursue development, integration, interoperability and optimization of systems to enhance performance in future battlefield scenarios: description in the field of information intensive systems integration in the military.
 Modern systems that comprise system of systems problems are not monolithic, rather they have five common characteristics: operational independence of the individual systems, managerial independence of the systems, geographical distribution, emergent behavior and evolutionary development: description in the field of evolutionary acquisition of complex adaptive systems in the military.
 Enterprise systems of systems engineering is focused on coupling traditional systems engineering activities with enterprise activities of strategic planning and investment analysis: description in the field of information intensive systems in private enterprise.
System of systems problems are a collection of trans-domain networks of heterogeneous systems that are likely to exhibit operational and managerial independence, geographical distribution, and emergent and evolutionary behaviors that would not be apparent if the systems and their interactions are modeled separately: description in the field of National Transportation System, Integrated Military and Space Exploration.

Taken together, all these descriptions suggest that a complete system of systems engineering framework is needed to improve decision support for system of systems problems.  Specifically, an effective system of systems engineering framework is needed to help decision makers to determine whether related infrastructure, policy and/or technology considerations as an interrelated whole are good, bad or neutral over time. The need to solve system of systems problems is urgent not only because of the growing complexity of today's challenges, but also because such problems require large monetary and resource investments with multi-generational consequences.

System-of-systems topics

The system-of-systems approach 
While the individual systems constituting a system of systems can be very different and operate independently, their interactions typically expose and deliver important emergent properties. These emergent patterns have an evolving nature that stakeholders must recognize, analyze and understand. The system of systems approach does not advocate particular tools, methods or practices; instead, it promotes a new way of thinking for solving grand challenges where the interactions of technology, policy, and economics are the primary drivers. System of systems study is related to the general study of designing, complexity and systems engineering, but also brings to the fore the additional challenge of design.

Systems of systems typically exhibit the behaviors of complex systems, but not all complex problems fall in the realm of systems of systems. Inherent to system of systems problems are several combinations of traits, not all of which are exhibited by every such problem:

 Operational Independence of Elements
 Managerial Independence of Elements
 Evolutionary Development
 Emergent Behavior
 Geographical Distribution of Elements
 Interdisciplinary Study
 Heterogeneity of Systems
 Networks of Systems

The first five traits are known as Maier's criteria for identifying system of systems challenges. The remaining three traits have been proposed from the study of mathematical implications of modeling and analyzing system of systems challenges by Dr. Daniel DeLaurentis and his co-researchers at Purdue University.

Research 
Current research into effective approaches to system of systems problems includes:

 Establishment of an effective frame of reference
 Crafting of a unifying lexicon 
 Developing effective methodologies to visualize and communicate complex systems 
 Distributed resource management  
 Study of designing architecture
 Interoperability 
 Data distribution policies: policy definition, design guidance and verification 
 Formal modelling language with integrated tools platform
 Study of various modeling, simulation and analysis techniques
 network theory
 agent based modeling
 general systems theory
 probabilistic robust design (including uncertainty modeling/management)
 object-oriented simulation and programming
 multi-objective optimization
 Study of various numerical and visual tools for capturing the interaction of system requirements, concepts and technologies

Applications 
Systems of systems, while still being investigated predominantly in the defense sector, is also seeing application in such fields as national air and auto transportation and space exploration. Other fields where it can be applied include health care, design of the Internet, software integration, and energy management and power systems. Social-ecological interpretations of resilience, where different levels of our world (e.g., the Earth system, the political system) are interpreted as interconnected or nested systems, take a systems-of-systems approach. An application in business can be found for supply chain resilience.

Educational institutions and industry 
Collaboration among wide array of organizations is helping to drive development of defining system of systems problem class and methodology for modeling and analysis of system of systems problems. There are ongoing projects throughout many commercial entities, research institutions, academic programs, and government agences.

Major stakeholders in the development of this concept are:
 Universities working on system of systems problems, including Purdue University, the Georgia Institute of Technology, Old Dominion University, George Mason University, the University of New Mexico, the Massachusetts Institute of Technology, Naval Postgraduate School and Carnegie Mellon University.
 Corporations active in this research such as The MITRE Corporation, AIRBUS, BAE Systems, Northrop Grumman, Boeing, Raytheon, Thales Group, CAE, Saber Astronautics and Lockheed Martin. 
 Government agencies that perform and support research in systems of systems research and applications, such as DARPA, the U.S. Federal Aviation Administration, NASA and Department of Defense (DoD)
For example, DoD recently established the National Centers for System of Systems Engineering to develop a formal methodology for system-of-systems engineering for applications in defense-related projects.

In another example, according to the Exploration Systems Architecture Study, NASA established the Exploration Systems Mission Directorate (ESMD) organization to lead the development of a new exploration “system-of-systems” to accomplish the goals outlined by President G.W. Bush in the 2004 Vision for Space Exploration.

A number of research projects and support actions, sponsored by the European Commission, are currently in progress. These target Strategic Objective IST-2011.3.3 in the FP7 ICT Work Programme (New paradigms for embedded systems, monitoring and control towards complex systems engineering). This objective has a specific focus on the "design, development and engineering of System-of-Systems". These projects include :
 T-AREA-SoS (Trans-Atlantic Research and Education Agenda on Systems of Systems), which aims "to increase European competitiveness in, and improve the societal impact of, the development and management of large complex systems in a range of sectors through the creation of a commonly agreed EU-US Systems of Systems (SoS) research agenda".
 COMPASS (Comprehensive Modelling for Advanced Systems of Systems), aiming to provide a semantic foundation and open tools framework to allow complex SoSs to be successfully and cost-effectively engineered, using methods and tools that promote the construction and early analysis of models.
 DANSE (Designing for Adaptability and evolutioN in System of systems Engineering), which aims to develop "a new methodology to support evolving, adaptive and iterative System of Systems life-cycle models based on a formal semantics for SoS inter-operations and supported by novel tools for analysis, simulation, and optimisation".
 ROAD2SOS (Roadmaps for System-of-System Engineering), aiming to develop "strategic research and engineering roadmaps in Systems of Systems Engineering and related case studies".
 DYMASOS (DYnamic MAnagement of physically-coupled Systems Of Systems), aiming to develop theoretical approaches and engineering tools for dynamic management of SoS based on industrial use cases.
 AMADEOS (Architecture for Multi-criticality Agile Dependable Evolutionary Open System-of-Systems) aiming to bring time awareness and evolution into the design of System-of- Systems (SoS) with possible emergent behavior, to establish a sound conceptual model, a generic architectural framework and a design methodology.

See also 
 Inheritance
 Software Library
 Object-oriented programming
 Model-based systems engineering
 Enterprise systems engineering
 Complex adaptive system
 Systems architecture
 Process architecture
 Software architecture
 Enterprise architecture
 Ultra-Large-Scale Systems
 Department of Defense Architecture Framework
 New Cybernetics

References

Further reading 
 Yaneer Bar-Yam et al. (2004) "The Characteristics and Emerging Behaviors of System-of-Systems" in: NECSI: Complex Physical, Biological and Social Systems Project, January 7, 2004.
 Kenneth E. Boulding (1954) "General Systems Theory - The Skeleton of Science," Management Science, Vol. 2, No. 3, ABI/INFORM Global, pp. 197–208.
 Crossley, W.A., System-of-Systems:, Introduction of Purdue University Schools of Engineering's Signature Area.
 Mittal, S., Martin, J.L.R. (2013) Netcentric System of Systems Engineering with DEVS Unified Process, CRC Press, Boca Raton, FL
 DeLaurentis, D. "Understanding Transportation as a System of Systems Design Problem," 43rd AIAA Aerospace Sciences Meeting, Reno, Nevada, January 10–13, 2005. AIAA-2005-0123.
 J. Lewe, D. Mavris,  Foundation for Study of Future Transportation Systems Through Agent-Based Simulation}, in: Proceedings of 24th International Congress of the Aeronautical Sciences (ICAS), Yokohama, Japan, August 2004. Session 8.1.
 
 Held, J.M.,The Modelling of Systems of Systems, PhD Thesis, University of Sydney, 2008
 D. Luzeaux & J.R. Ruault, "Systems of Systems", ISTE Ltd and John Wiley & Sons Inc, 2010
 D. Luzeaux, J.R. Ruault & J.L. Wippler, "Complex Systems and Systems of Systems Engineering", ISTE Ltd and John Wiley & Sons Inc, 2011
 Popper, S., Bankes, S., Callaway, R., and DeLaurentis, D. (2004) System-of-Systems Symposium: Report on a Summer Conversation, July 21–22, 2004, Potomac Institute for Policy Studies, Arlington, VA.

External links 
 System of Systems - video IBM

 IEEE International Conference on System of Systems Engineering (SoSE)
 System of Systems Engineering Center of Excellence
 System of Systems, Systems Engineering Guide (USD AT&L Aug 2008)
 International Journal of System of Systems Engineering (IJSSE)

Systems engineering
Systems theory